Fred P. Branson (March 1, 1881 – October 5, 1960) was a justice of the Oklahoma Supreme Court from 1926 to 1929, serving as chief justice from 1927 to 1929.

Fred P. Branson was born in Rockmart, Georgia on March 1, 1881 to Levi Branson and Rhoda Page Mull. Rhoda had an older son, Joseph Mull, from her marriage to the late Harrison Mull. The Mulls had moved to Arkansas, but after her first husband died, she and Joseph moved back to the small town of Cass Station, Georgia, where she met and married Levi Branson, a widower who already had 13 children from his previous marriage. Levi and Rhoda Mull Branson had three sons and one daughter: Thomas Branson, Frederick Page Branson, Jessie Branson Adams, Homer Branson and Rhoda Page Branson.

Early life
It is unclear when Rhoda and her surviving children relocated from Cass Station to Rockmart, then located primarily in Polk County, Georgia, where Fred began receiving his first exposure to public education in the so-called "field schools". One condition for states who had left the Union to join the Confederate States of America to rejoin the Union was to provide "separate but equal" schools for black and white children. The State quickly responded by making elementary education the responsibility of the individual counties, but without providing any individual funding sources.

Education
In 1889, the Piedmont Institute was established in Rockmart by the North Georgia Methodist Conference to provide more than an elementary education.  Branson attended Piedmont for at least two years. In 1912, Piedmont closed its operations. Cass County bought the building and reopened it as the first high school in the Cass County School District.

Branson then enrolled in Mercer College at Macon, Georgia, where he obtained a law degree on June 11, 1903. He was admitted to the Georgia Bar on the same day, then went home on vacation. After that, he travelled to Oklahoma Territory, stopping  briefly in Oklahoma City, before going to McAlester, then in Indian Territory, where he began working for a year in a private law office.

Professional career
On August 4, 1904, he married Miss Eula Jeans, a native Tennesseean who was then living in McAlester. By September 15, 1904, he and his bride had moved to Muskogee, where he had accepted a position as a law clerk for the Dawes Commission.

After leaving Emory, he moved to McAlester in Indian Territory, where he worked as  Deputy Clerk of the United States Court of Appeals for Indian Territory. He did not stay long before moving on to Muskogee, where he worked for the Commissioner of the Five Civilized Tribes. He soon left this office and opened his own law office in Muskogee.

Political life
Fred discovered a love for politics while a youth in Georgia.   In the summer of 1908, he was nominated as a representative to the State Democratic Committee as representative for Muskogee County, where he served until 1912, including three years as committee chairman. He resigned both positions after the party scored impressive wins in the 1912 elections. In April 1914, he was appointed to fill the unexpired term of R. C. Allen, who had earlier resigned as the judge of the Third Judicial District. elected County Attorney of Muskogee County, Oklahoma for two terms. Then he was appointed District Judge for the Judicial District comprising Muskogee and Wagoner County, Oklahoma. Then he ran for the Supreme Court of Oklahoma, and was elected for a 6-year term. He served two of the six years as Chief Justice of the Oklahoma Supreme Court.

While serving as Chief Justice, the Oklahoma House of Representatives voted to impeach Governor Henry Johnston on December 12, 1927. By the next morning, the House had also voted to impeach the Chief Justice, who had already ruled that the impeachment session had no legal standing, because the Governor had not called for the special session and the Oklahoma constitution did not give the legislative body the power to call itself into session.

Later life
After leaving the Oklahoma Supreme Court, Branson moved to Texas, where he became very successful investing in oil leases that made him very wealthy. Then, Oklahoma Governor Roy J. Turner appointed Fred as President of the Grand River Dam Authority (GRDA), where he remained until 1959. After GRDA, he went back into elective politics. He made two tries to become the Democratic candidate for U. S. House of Representatives, but neither succeeded. He then announced his intention to run for Governor, but withdrew after former Governor Turner announced his own candidacy.

Personal
He married Eula Jeans in 1903, who preceded him in death. No children were born to this union. Mrs. Branson died January 27, 1950, and was buried in the Branson mausoleum in Myrtle Hill Cemetery, Rome, Georgia.

He was a member of:
 Saint Paul Methodist Church of Muskogee; 
 Masonic Lodge No. 28 of Muskogee; 
 Chapter Three of Royal Arch Masons, 
 Muskogee Commandery No. 2 of the Knights Templar ;
 Bedouin Temple of the Nobles of the Mystic Shrine; 
 Life member of Lodge 517 of BPOE. He was a member of the Muskogee County and Oklahoma Bar Associations and a member of the Democratic party of Oklahoma. He was the first State Chairman of the Democratic party of Oklahoma.

Death
Judge Branson died on October 5, 1960 in a Tulsa Hospital, after an illness that had lasted for a year. His funeral service was conducted by  Dr. Wilford Jones, minister of Saint Paul Methodist Church of Muskogee, Oklahoma, and interment was in the Branson mausoleum at Myrtle Hill Cemetery, Rome, Georgia.

Notes

References

Justices of the Oklahoma Supreme Court
1881 births
1960 deaths
People from Rockmart, Georgia
People from Muskogee, Oklahoma
Emory University alumni
Oklahoma Democrats
20th-century American judges